The Gusevskoye peat railway is located in Vladimir Oblast, Russia.

History 
Gusevskoye peat railway emerged in the 1920s, in the area Gus-Khrustalny District, in a settlement named Gus-Khrustalny in 1931 became a town. Gusevskoye railway was built for hauling peat and workers and operates year-round with several pairs of trains a day. At present only  of the railway is operational, current operations include passenger traffic (workers-tourists) and freight traffic, transportation of peat. A peat briquette factory was built and put into operation in 2010 in a settlement named Gusevskiy. A peat briquette factory was built and put into operation in 2011 in a settlement named Mezinovskiy.
About 2011 half of the railroad was dismantled. Formed two separate railway network.

Current status 
There was two separated railways, operated by different companies.
 Guseevskiy – westbound. 
 Mezinovskiy – northbound.
Transportation of peat to the briquette factory is ongoing.

Rolling stock

Locomotives 

Locomotive Depot – Mezinovskoye:
TU7 – № 2999, 3310, 2087, 3028, 3311
TU6D – № 0023
TU6A – № 1663
ESU2A – № 249, 721, 997, 994
ESU1 – № 277 (Snow blower)
TD-5U Pioneer
GMD4 rail lorry (to the museum in 2013)
Engine Shed - Gusevskoye:
TU4 – № 2303, 1547
ESU2A – № 1024, 987
Draisine - PD1 – № 764

Railroad car
Flatcar
Tank car
Snowplow
Tank car - fire train
Passenger car
Side-tipping wagons
Open wagon for peat
Hopper car to transport track ballast

Work trains 
Crane GK-5
Track laying cranes PPR2ma

Gallery

See also
Bioenergy
Narrow-gauge railways in Russia
Mokeiha-Zybinskoe peat railway

References and sources

External links

 Official Website «ENBIMA Group» (Gusevskiy) 
 Official Website «Vladimir-Peat» (Mezinovskiy) 
 Photo - project «Steam Engine» 
 «The site of the railroad» S. Bolashenko 

750 mm gauge railways in Russia
Rail transport in Vladimir Oblast